Trachylepis maculilabris is a species of skink. Commonly referred to as the speckle-lipped skink or speckle-lipped mabuya. It is distributed through much of sub-Saharan Africa.,

References

Trachylepis
Reptiles described in 1845
Taxa named by John Edward Gray